Bonobo is a 2014 British comedy-drama film written and directed by Matthew Hammett Knott and starring Tessa Peake-Jones, Josie Lawrence, and James Norton.

The film is about middle-aged widow Judith (Tessa Peake-Jones), and her attempts to convince her daughter Lily to leave an alternative commune and return to university. Bonobo premiered at the Raindance Film Festival, where it was nominated for Best British Feature.

Plot
 Middle-aged widow Judith is worried about her 23-year-old daughter Lily, who has joined what she thinks is a sect. In fact, a group of youngsters overseen by middle-aged Anita have set up a commune based on the lifestyle of the Bonobo chimpanzee (Pan paniscus), in which all social conflicts are resolved by having sex.

Deciding that she'll ‘rescue’ Lily, Judith turns up at the commune, only to be told that she'll have to wait until she's in the right state of mind to talk to her daughter. Judith herself starts opening up, but at a party rejects Anita's advances. Back home, Lily tells her mother that she has to be true to herself. Judith admits her formerly hidden desires and tells Lily she is going to let her decide her future for herself.

Meanwhile, sex itself becomes a problem for the group, and one member is asked to leave. When mother and daughter return to the commune, Judith is able to show her feelings for Anita. A young woman, a neighbour, arrives and is welcomed by the group. As everyone hugs and welcomes her, Judith says, "I'll leave you to it", then she turns and slowly, quietly leaves and walks away.

Cast
 Tessa Peake-Jones as Judith
 Josie Lawrence as Anita
 James Norton as Ralph
 Eleanor Wyld as Lily
 Will Tudor as Toby
 Orlando Seale as Malcolm
 Carolyn Pickles as Celia
 Patricia Potter as Sandra
  Milton Lopes as Peter
 Harriet Kemsley as Helen

Production
Bonobo was privately financed and shot on location in Wimborne Minster, Dorset.

Reception
Bonobo received positive reviews from critics. Total Film gave it four stars calling it "smart, funny and original", while Tim Robey of The Telegraph called it "frisky, liberated, funny, alive".

References

External links
 

2014 films
2014 comedy-drama films
British comedy-drama films
Films set in Dorset
Films shot in Dorset
2010s English-language films
2010s British films